Alaska Off-Road Warriors was an American reality competition television series on the History Channel. The show followed five teams of two competing in off-road races through the wilderness of Alaska. The series was produced by Original Productions.

Broadcast
The series premiered in the U.S. on The History Channel on November 30, 2014 and continued weekly.

Internationally, the series premiered in Australia on A&E on February 4, 2015, in New Zealand on The Box on August 29, 2015 and in India on History TV18 on August 25, 2015.

Episodes

References

External links
 
 

2010s American reality television series
2014 American television series debuts
2015 American television series endings
History (American TV channel) original programming
English-language television shows
Television series by Original Productions